Iconaster longimanus, the icon star or double star, is a species of starfish in the family Goniasteridae. It is found in the west and central Indo-Pacific Ocean. The genus name comes from the Greek eikon, meaning portrait or image and possibly referring to the way the marginal plates frame the disc, and aster, meaning star. The specific name comes from the Latin longus manus and refers to the long, slender arms.

Description
Iconaster longimanus has five thin, tapering, flattened arms. It has a marginal row of large plates that resemble mosaic tiles and contrast in colour with the disc. The margin is usually tan with symmetrically arranged dark brown bands and the disc is orange-brown.

Distribution
Iconaster longimanus is native to the tropical west and central Indo-Pacific Ocean. Its range includes south eastern Arabia, the Philippines, Singapore, Malaysia, the South China Sea, Indonesia and northern and western Australia. It is common in Singapore where its typical habitat is lower reef slopes and adjoining areas of rubble where it feeds on lithophytes growing on rocks and coral fragments.

Biology
Not a lot is known about the feeding habits of Iconaster longimanus but it is believed to include in its diet detritus, bacteria, micro-organisms and small benthic invertebrates.

This starfish produces large yolky eggs which develop directly into juvenile starfish without an intervening larval stage.

References

Goniasteridae
Animals described in 1859
Fauna of the Indian Ocean
Fauna of the Pacific Ocean